Entomophagy (from Greek ἔντομον , 'insect', and φαγεῖν , 'to eat') is the practice of eating insects. An alternative term is insectivory. Terms for organisms that practice entomophagy are entomophage and insectivore.

Entomophagy is sometimes defined to also include the eating of arthropods other than insects, such as arachnids and myriapods; eating arachnids may also be referred to as arachnophagy.

In non-humans

Entomophagy is widespread among many animals, including non-human primates. Animals that feed primarily on insects are called insectivores.

Insects, nematodes and fungi that obtain their nutrition from insects are sometimes termed entomophagous, especially in the context of biological control applications. These may also be more specifically classified into predators, parasites or parasitoids, while viruses, bacteria and fungi that grow on or inside insects may also be termed entomopathogenic (see also entomopathogenic fungi).

In humans

Entomophagy is scientifically described as widespread among non-human primates and common among many human communities. The scientific term describing the practice of eating insects by humans is anthropo-entomophagy. The eggs, larvae, pupae, and adults of certain insects  have been eaten by humans from prehistoric times to the present day. Around 3,000 ethnic groups practice entomophagy. Human insect-eating (anthropo-entomophagy) is common to cultures in most parts of the world, including Central and South America, Africa, Asia, Australia, and New Zealand. Eighty percent of the world's nations eat insects of 1,000 to 2,000 species. FAO has registered some 1,900 edible insect species and estimates that there were, in 2005, some two billion insect consumers worldwide. FAO suggests eating insects as a possible solution to environmental degradation caused by livestock production.

In some societies, primarily western nations, entomophagy is uncommon or taboo. Today, insect eating is uncommon in North America and Europe, but insects remain a popular food elsewhere, and some companies are trying to introduce insects as food into Western diets, despite massive pushback from local populations. A recent analysis of Google Trends data showed that people in Japan have become increasingly interested in entomophagy since 2013.

See also
 Insects as feed
 Human interactions with insects
 Insects in medicine
 Insects as food
 Taboo food and drink

References

Further reading

External links

 
 Edible insects: Future prospects for food and feed security
 Risk profile related to production and consumption of insects as food and feed European Food Safety Authority 2015

Ethology
Carnivory